Collset (stylized as [Coll:set]) is the first full-length album by D'espairsRay, released on June 29, 2005. Along with new recordings, it also features two remixes of previously released songs. The first press limited edition comes housed in a special slipcase and a photo booklet titled '[The World in a Cage].' This booklet also contains lyrics to the song. The tracks on the limited press are also arranged differently from the normal release.

Track listing

Track 6 and 8 are not on the limited edition.

References

2005 albums
D'espairsRay albums